Kbach kun dambong veng is the term for a Cambodian martial art based on the long staff.  The term "dambong" means "staff" in the Khmer language and the term "veng" means "long".  Translated literally it means "the art/martial skill of the long staff." The term is also used in the phrase "land of the lost staff", Battambang.  In the town of Battambang there is a big statue of 'Grandfather Dambong' holding the lost staff. It is based on different mae(s) which can be imagined as a Khmer version of kata(s).

See also 
Bojutsu
Eskrima
Krabi Krabong
Silambam

External links
TVK documentary
staff demonstration
Human Weapon

Cambodian martial arts